The Questor Tapes is a 1974 American made-for-television sci-fi drama film about an android (portrayed by Robert Foxworth) with incomplete memory tapes who is searching for his creator and his purpose. Conceived by Gene Roddenberry, who is credited as executive consultant, the script is credited to Roddenberry and fellow Star Trek alumnus Gene L. Coon. The pilot was directed by Richard Colla.

A novelization, written by D. C. Fontana (another Star Trek alumnus), was dedicated to Coon, who died before the program was broadcast.

Plot
Project Questor is the brainchild of the genius Emil Vaslovik, Ph.D., a Nobel laureate. Vaslovik had developed plans to build a superhuman android. A team of the world's foremost experts is able to build the android even though they do not understand the components with which they are working — they are only able to follow the instructions and install the parts left by Vaslovik, who has disappeared. Attempts to decode the programming tape were worse than merely unsuccessful—they also erased approximately half of the tape's contents. They decide to substitute their own programming, over the objections of Jerry Robinson (Mike Farrell), the only team member who had actually worked with Dr. Vaslovik. He is overruled by the head of the project, Geoffrey Darrow (John Vernon). When the android's body has been finished, the new tape is loaded, but with no apparent results. In desperation, Robinson persuades Darrow to allow Vaslovik's tape — what remains of it — to be loaded. Again, the team is disappointed, as there appears to be no response.

Once left alone, the android comes to life. It adds various cosmetic touches to a previously featureless outer skin, transforming itself from an "it" to a "him", and he (Robert Foxworth) then leaves the laboratory to visit Vaslovik's office and archives; it is there that he first identifies himself as "part of Project Questor". The android then seeks out Robinson, whom he forces to accompany him in a search for Vaslovik, with Darrow in pursuit of both, following a minuscule datum in his original programming.

Questor (who becomes more "human" as the story progresses) only knows that it has something to do with an "aquatic vehicle" — a boat — and that if he does not find Vaslovik before the end of a countdown, the nuclear generator in his abdomen will overload and explode. Vaslovik had programmed this into him to prevent his creation from being misused, and time is running out. The pair, traveling to England, escape from custody and travel to the home of Lady Helena Trimble (Dana Wynter), who had known and worked with Vaslovik. (Her name was an homage to Bjo Trimble, who had led the fan campaign to keep Star Trek on the air.) After Robinson refuses Questor's naïve suggestion that the scientist seduce Lady Helena as a way to get information, Questor announces that he will make the attempt, adding, "I am fully functional."

Just as Questor deciphers the clues and tells Robinson that he knows where Vaslovik is, he is machine gunned by a British soldier in a park, whereupon he returned to the laboratory. Robinson repairs Questor, and Darrow gives him two options: If Robinson puts a homing transmitter inside the android, they will be given a plane to go find Vaslovik, but if Robinson refuses, the android will simply be flown to a safe location where the explosion will not endanger anyone. Robinson implants the beacon, and they jet off to Mount Ararat; the "boat" imperative, as Questor had realized just minutes before being shot, had referred to Noah's Ark.

Robinson and Questor reach a cave concealed inside Mount Ararat with seconds to spare. Questor's timer is made safe, and he has found Emil Vaslovik (Lew Ayres), who tells Questor and Robinson that he, too, is an android. Questor is the last of a series, going back to "the dawn of this world," left there by "Masters" to serve and protect mankind. They functioned by a law which Vaslovik quotes to Questor:

Each of the Masters' previous androids had a lifespan of several hundred years, at the end of which each assembled its replacement. The unexpected, rapid advent of nuclear physics and the radioactive fallout from above-ground nuclear testing had damaged Vaslovik. Questor's design corrected these failures, and finally Vaslovik is able to die in peace, after asking Robinson to help Questor learn about humanity.

Darrow, having followed the pair, has heard enough to know how important it is that Questor be allowed to fulfill his mission. Unfortunately, he has brought the military with him to destroy the android. The cynical Darrow believes that this is proof that humanity does not deserve Questor's help. Questor convinces him otherwise.

Deciding to sacrifice his own life for Questor's sake, Darrow takes the transmitter and leaves, telling the military commander that not only had Vaslovik gone insane, but also that the android has escaped, and to send in jet fighters when the beacon signal is picked up. He then takes off in the jet that Questor and Robinson had used, turning on the transmitter as he goes so that they will think that the android is aboard.

Robinson and Questor, now outside the cave, look up into the sky. Robinson tells Questor that he cannot see anything, to which the android replies, "I wish that I could not." This is notably his first verbal expression of emotion, Questor's first visual expression of emotion had occurred when his timer had been made safe; he had then regarded Robinson with a smile. The plane is then destroyed, killing Darrow. Questor and Robinson begin their mission together.

Cast
 Robert Foxworth as Questor
 Mike Farrell as Jerry Robinson
 John Vernon as Geoffrey Darrow
 Lew Ayres as Dr. Emil Vaslovik
 James Shigeta as Dr. Chen 
Robert Douglas as Dr. Michaels 
Dana Wynter as Lady Helena Trimble 
Majel Barrett as Dr. Bradley 
Ellen Weston as Allison Sample 
Fred Sadoff as Dr. Audret
Walter Koenig as Administrative Assistant

Production

Development
The Questor Tapes was a pilot for a television series. A 13-episode go-ahead was given for the series before the television movie was aired, with both Foxworth and Farrell having signed to reprise their roles. Joining the actors behind the scenes were producers Michael Rhodes and Earl Booth and story editor Larry Alexander. The green-lighted series was slated for Friday nights at 10 p.m. on NBC — the "death slot" where the final season of the original Star Trek had withered.

Conflict between Roddenberry and both Universal and NBC over the content of the proposed series doomed it, most notably ignoring the revelation at the end of the TV movie and eliminating the key character of Jerry Robinson. These changes were too much for Roddenberry, who abandoned the project. No episodes were produced.

The Questor Tapes was one of a series of television movies in which Roddenberry was involved, which also included Genesis II,  Planet Earth,  Strange New World and Spectre. All were intended as pilots; none led to a series.

Casting
Originally Leonard Nimoy was asked to play Questor. He posed in makeup for production photos and agreed to do the weekly series if picked up. However, Roddenberry hired Robert Foxworth. Mike Farrell was cast as Jerry Robinson.

Thematic origins
The Questor Tapes was Roddenberry's second treatment of the idea of an outside force benevolently aiding human development. In 1968, he co-wrote, with Art Wallace, an episode of Star Trek which also served as a potential spin-off series pilot, "Assignment: Earth". In this story, Gary Seven was a human whose ancestors were abducted from Earth around 4000 BCE. Returning to Earth in the late 20th century, his mission was to make sure mankind did not destroy itself with nuclear weapons. In the would-be series, he would have carried out other missions to protect mankind.

In The Questor Tapes, Questor's origin is also extraterrestrial, and his mission to serve and protect mankind remains the same as Gary Seven's.

Music
The music for The Questor Tapes was scored by Gil Mellé, who was a jazz musician as well as a  saxophonist, composer, and also noted as a painter. (Some of his music for The Questor Tapes later made its way into Kolchak: The Night Stalker. Both properties were developed at, and produced out of, Universal Studios.) Mellé also was known for scoring My Sweet Charlie, That Certain Summer, and Frankenstein: The True Story. His most well-known film score was The Andromeda Strain, whose director, Robert Wise, later directed Star Trek: The Motion Picture.

Reception

Release
The Questor Tapes aired on NBC on January 23, 1974. The telefilm was released, as a MOD (Manufacture-On-Demand) DVD on September 18, 2012, by Universal Pictures's Vault Series in Region 0.

Awards
In 1975, The Questor Tapes was nominated for a Hugo Award for Best Dramatic Presentation.

Legacy

In Star Trek: The Next Generation
Gene Roddenberry's son, Rod, has confirmed that the Questor android was an inspiration for the character of Data, from Roddenberry's later Star Trek: The Next Generation. In a casino scene situated in a London nightclub, Questor successfully detects weighted ("loaded") dice, and their subsequent realignment in his precise, powerful hand was later duplicated by Data in the second season Star Trek: The Next Generation installment "The Royale".

Another Questor/Data inside joke came from a scene in which Questor discussed the human trait of "negotiating" through sexual activity, informing Robinson, "I am fully functional." While there is no such activity in The Questor Tapes, in "The Naked Now", an episode of The Next Generation Data also comments, to Tasha Yar, "I am fully functional."

Proposed remake
Herbert J. Wright, who had a long friendship with Roddenberry, had strong ties to the series that was never made. The two had met when Wright became aware of the movie, fell in love with the story, and wanted to be a part of the series. After some sample submissions, Wright was allowed to join, but he never had the chance, as the series was scrapped after Roddenberry's creative differences with the studio. Wright kept the idea alive, with hope of the series coming to fruition throughout the years.

When the rights finally came back to the Roddenberry family in the early 2000s, Wright secured the rights with the blessing of Roddenberry's family to produce the series. Wright made several promotions for the series in 2003 at conventions. Wright even reserved production locations while working on a first script. The show suffered what was at first a simple setback when Wright fell ill within a year, which delayed the show's development. Wright died in 2005 before he could finally bring the show to life.

In January 2010, Roddenberry Productions announced that it was working with Imagine Television on a pilot for a new version of The Questor Tapes. No further information was ever made available.

References

Citations

Sources

External links
 
 
 The Questor Tapes at Archive.org

 
1974 television films 
1974 films 
1970s science fiction films 
Android (robot) films 
American robot films 
NBC network original films 
Television pilots not picked up as a series 
Films directed by Richard A. Colla 
Films produced by Gene Roddenberry 
Films with screenplays by Gene Roddenberry 
Films scored by Gil Mellé 
Films set in Turkey 
Television films as pilots 
American science fiction television films 
Fictional artificial intelligences 
Mount Ararat 
1970s English-language films 
1970s American films